Étienne Jean-Baptiste Louis des Gallois de La Tour (2 June 1750 – 20 March 1820) was Bishop of Moulins before emigrating, then Archbishop of Bourges under the Restoration.

Biography 
He was the eldest son of Charles Jean-Baptiste des Gallois de La Tour (1717-1802), intendant of the Generality of Provence and first president of the parliament of Aix-en-Provence, and Marie-Madeleine d'Aligre; he is also the nephew of Etienne François d'Aligre.

He was a councillor in the parliament of Aix, then commendatory abbot of the royal abbey of Notre-Dame de Blanche-Couronne in 1774, prior and count of Perrecy. 

Abbé de Latour was ordained a priest on 19 April 1783. He became vicar general of the diocese of Autun in the district of Moulins and dean of the collegiate church of Notre-Dame de Moulins in October 1785. He was appointed bishop of the new diocese of Moulins in October 1788.

During the Revolution, he was solicited by the Directory of Allier, but he refused to ask for the canonical institution and emigrated in 1790 to England and then to Italy. During his exile, he was chaplain to Madame Adélaïde and Madame Victoire de France until their deaths in Trieste in 1799. He also ministered to the French prisoners of war at the Norman Cross Prison.

On his return to France, he was appointed Archbishop of Bourges on 8 August 1817, advocated on 1 October 1817 and consecrated archbishop on 26 September 1819.

References 

1750 births
1820 deaths
French bishops
Archbishops of Bourges